Matureia (formerly Maturéia) is a municipality in the state of Paraíba in the Northeast Region of Brazil. The city is located in the Teixeira ridge region at an altitude of 860 meters (2,674 ft)

The municipality contains the larger part of the  Pico do Jabre State Park, created in 1992.

See also
List of municipalities in Paraíba

References

Municipalities in Paraíba